El Asalto  ("") is a 1960  Argentine black-and-white film crime drama film directed and by Kurt Land. The film was based on a book by Enrique Silberstein and premiered in Buenos Aires. It starred Alberto de Mendoza.

Plot
A group of mobsters plan a bank heist. But the rehearsal of the robbery is plenty of personal drama, disputes and almost farcical mishaps.

Main cast
Alberto de Mendoza...The Boss
Egle Martin
Luis Tasca
Tato Bores
Osvaldo Terranova
Thelma del Río
Argentino Ledesma
Mario Lozano
Héctor Méndez
Irma Gabriel

Other cast
Osvaldo María Cabrera
Víctor Catalano
José De Angelis ....  Superintendent Oliva
Conrado Diana
Ángel Díaz
Rolando Dumas ....  Francisco Coba
Mariquita Gallegos ....  Woman in disco
Claudia Lapacó ....  Woman in disco
René Lester
Pablo Moret
Miguel Paparelli ....  The Usher
Gilberto Peyret ....  Sanz
María Esther Rodrigo
Carlos Roig
Félix Tortorelli ....  The Cashier

External links
 

1960 films
1960s Spanish-language films
Films based on Argentine novels
1960 crime drama films
Films directed by Kurt Land
Argentine crime drama films
1960s Argentine films